Frank Stanfield (April 24, 1872 – September 25, 1931) was an entrepreneur in Nova Scotia, Canada, who was the 15th Lieutenant Governor of Nova Scotia (1930–31) and represented Colchester County in the Nova Scotia House of Assembly (1911–20 and 1925–30). He was the father of the politicians Robert Lorne Stanfield and Frank Thomas Stanfield.

Early life 
He was born in Truro, Nova Scotia, the son of Charles E. Stanfield, who established the Stanfield Mills in Truro, and Lydia Dawson. In 1896, with his brother John Stanfield, he took over the operation of the business, which was incorporated as Stanfield's Limited in 1906. Its "unshrinkable" underwear, developed in 1898, became popular with gold prospectors in the Yukon. The company expanded to be one of the largest producers of woollen goods in Canada.

Career 
Stanfield represented Colchester County in the Nova Scotia House of Assembly from 1911 until 1920, serving with Robert H. Kennedy. He was re-elected five years later and sat as a Conservative member from 1925 until 1928. He was appointed as the 15th Lieutenant Governor of Nova Scotia in 1930 but died in office in Halifax the following year at the age of 59.

Family 
Stanfield married Sarah Emma Thomas in 1901. Their son Robert Lorne Stanfield became premier of Nova Scotia and served as leader of the federal Progressive Conservative Party. Another son Frank Thomas Stanfield also served in the House of Commons of Canada.

References 
 Marble, AE Nova Scotians at home and abroad: biographical sketches ... (1977) p. 372

1872 births
1931 deaths
Lieutenant Governors of Nova Scotia
People from Truro, Nova Scotia
Progressive Conservative Association of Nova Scotia MLAs